The Citroën BX 4TC is a rally car, designed, developed and produced by French manufacturer Citroën; derived from the Citroën BX production car. A road-going, street-legal version, was built to meet the requirements of the Group B category of the World Rally Championship. A total of 200 models were produced, as this was the production requirement.

Rally version
With the 1985 World Rally Championship as its objective, the development of the new Group B took place under the control of Citroën's commercial services. It is the BX which, from 1983, is chosen. The specifications prove to be restrictive in view of the ambitions: you have to keep the architecture of the BX and take as many series 1 parts as possible. The 20 cars are built by the Citroën competition department based in Trappes and the hulls by Heuliez. The first tests take place on the circuit in December 1985, but reveal major handicaps: high weight, lack of power, and hydraulic suspensions increasing understeer. After two retirements for breakage and going off the road at Monte-Carlo 1986, it was in Sweden that the BX obtained its best place, sixth, thanks to Jean-Claude Andruet. On their last participation in the Acropolis rally, the three BXs retired. Citroën then withdrew from the championship following the dramas in Portugal and the Tour de Corse, to improve its cars 2, and 3.

Apart from experience in the World Rally Championship, the car was entered in rallycross in 1989 by Jacky Pivert, but without significant results for him.

In 1991, 1992 and 1993 Jean-Luc Pailler became triple French rallycross champion with his Turbo 4x4, as well as Division 2 European Champion in 1993. His BX was not a 4TC but a totally distinct prototype. (1900 engine)

The 4TC, therefore, did not enjoy much success during its short rallying career. In addition to the faults mentioned above, the unexpected stoppage of Group B in the year following its first entry did not give Citroën time to improve it much. The car had however aroused high expectations when its launch was announced, due to Citroën's past successes in rallying with the DS. The brand will keep a burning memory for several years.

Production version

Group B homologation requires the manufacture and sale to the public of 200 "customer" road versions. Only 86 copies (also made by Heuliez ) found takers, the unsold ones were destroyed by Citroën 4. The price of the BX 4TC was 248,500  F in 1986. One of the Citroën BX 4TCs kept by Heuliez in his conservatory was put up for sale on July 7, 2012by Artcurial. This BX 4TC was advertised as driving, in excellent bodywork condition, with an impeccable interior. It showed 1036 kilometers on the odometer. This copy had two particularities: on the one hand, the car was in its time assembled by hand by bodywork students from the Professional School of Niort, on the other hand, to distinguish it from other models, it was painted black. Estimate: 40,000 to 60,000 euros - Bid amount: 32,167 euros 5, 6 . 10 HP engine: 4 cylinders in line (cast iron casing) 2,141  cc, original Simca-Chrysler then Peugeot 505 Turbo, placed in the front overhang, in a longitudinal position, with Garrett turbocharger with air/air intercooler, K Jetronic Bosch injection, 200 hp DIN at 5250  rpm. Five-speed SM-type gearbox.

The poor sales of the production BX 4TC are mainly explained, on the one hand, by its lack of image due to the lack of success of the rally version, and on the other hand by its performance, which is a little behind for a sports car. of such an extraction, in particular, because of its weight. However, its exclusivity, its pure Citroën soul (with the hydropneumatic suspension and a style with a strong personality derived from the BX) and, despite everything, its history in motorsport have, over time, take precedence over these defects. Today, the 4TC is a real collector's item, the rare copies of which trade for several tens of thousands of euros.

Manufacturer performance: 220 km/h and 0 to 100 km/h in 7.5 seconds.

Performance measured: 211 km/h, 0 to 100 in 9.1 seconds (Sport Auto).

References

External links 

All-wheel-drive vehicles
BX
Front-wheel-drive vehicles
Group B cars
Hatchbacks
Mid-size cars
Rally cars
Cars introduced in 1982
Cars of France